Washingtonville may refer to one of three municipalities in the United States:

 Washingtonville, New York
 Washingtonville, Ohio
 Washingtonville, Pennsylvania

See also
List of places named for George Washington #Other